Agori Fort is a fort located at distance of about 10 km from Chopan near Obra at riverside of Son River, in the Sonbhadra district, which is 35 km from Robertsganj, on SH 5 Road in the Sonbhadra district, Uttar Pradesh India. There is a temple of Goddess Kali.
This is Religious place for the Agori Baba.
Agori Fort was the residential palace of the Khayaravala dynasty and Chandel dynasty.

History
The kingdom of Balandshah's descendants was established at Sonbhadra in the 12th century. Balandshah (Khayaravala) Kharwar dynasty belonged to the Suryavansh.The kingdom was extended to the Belan river near Ghoraval and to Palamu like the east, Singrauli to the south and Sidhi, Rewa and Ambikapur in Madhya Pradesh. Which was not small in terms of the conditions of the 12th century (Ramnath Shivendra 1984) Mirzapur Gazetteer (1984) states that this state was quite prosperous, till the end of 12th century there was the rule of Madanshah, a descendant of Balandshah, in the 12th century. Finally, there was a war between the Chauhans and the Chandels on the banks of the Vetravati (present-day Vetva) river. This war was fought by the Chandelsunder the leadership of Barimal and Parimaland Chandela was defeated in this battle and Vijayashree Chauhano was defeated. Gazetteer writes on the basis of public opinion that Kharwar, who escaped from Barimal and Parimal war zones, reached the court of King Madanshah and sought refuge. He is hired by the Madanshah and is entrusted with the care of livestock elephant horses and descendants of the present-day Badhar state believe that he was appointed as the minister of Angori state. Gradually, they strengthen their position and establish their credibility. Gazetteer further states that, Madanshah was ill, His son was said to take part in the war. Madanshah, Chandel Parimal and Barimal, takes the task here to convey the news of his body to his son. Barimal and Parimal did not convey this information to Madanshah's son and Madanshah dies. Before dying, they hand over the key of the treasure to Parimal and Barimal. Parmal and Barimal declare their king. Madanshah's son returns for Agori and makes his stop around the Panda River, about thirty miles from Agori. Dantushruti is a descendant of Balandshah, the king of Madwas. With the forces of Parimal and Barimal Agori, they surround and kill Madanshah's son Ramah and the prince of Agori. History repeats itself. Ghatam, a descendant of Balandshah and the successor of Madanshah, formed a new army in an unknown place. In Shivendra Mahendra (2005), it is speculated that this unknown area is Rohitashgandha of Sasaram or some place in the forest states mentioned by Samudragupta. In 1290 AD, Ghatam attacked the Chandela kings of Vijaygarh  Agori. All the men of the Chandela dynasty were killed and in the attack, a queen was safely a big role of her maid while escaping from the fort.

Vijayanagar reaches the border of the state and went to Villavangaon with the sister of the right who is situated between Mirzapur and Chunar. With the help of the Raja of Vijaypur, the newborn child was brought up in Shahabad, where the deceased queen was a relative. The name of the child was Udanadeva, when Udan Dev became an adult, he attacked that Agori with the help of King Kannit (present-day Mirzapur). In 1310 AD, Udandev succeeded in winning the Agori and Balanda Shah's descendants went to the Rewa marches where he remained the ruler till independence. And Kharwar dynasty belongs to Chedi  Kalachuri dynasty

. Veer Lorik, the hero of "Lorikayan" fought and killed king Molgat at this place.

Location
The fort is surrounded by the rivers from three sides viz. Bijul/Vijul/Vrijul, Rihand and Son River. It has also been enclosed with trenches on all sides to protect it from any attack.

Attractions
The war between Molagt King and Veer Lorik was held here. There is an artistic idol of the Goddess Durga in the fort at the entrance to the courtyard. There is a well, which is said to be fed from some river. Thousands of people come here for worship from far away. Upon leaving fortress there is an ochre mountain, local people say that this mountain was launched edged sword.

There is a stone in the form of an elephant at the center of river son which is called Krmaamel elephant of Molagt King who was killed by Veer Lorik. The fort can be reached by boat from Chopan.

See also
Stanley Leighton
Vijaygarh Fort
Sonbhadra

References

4. www.academicjournal.in › 2-...PDF
Web results
Page 1 खरवार जनजाति : एक ऐतिहासिक ...

https://infolog.in/agori-barhar-zamindari/

Forts in Uttar Pradesh
Tourist attractions in Sonbhadra district
Buildings and structures in Sonbhadra district